Ursula Jeitziner (born 14 March 1972) is a Swiss long-distance runner. She competed in the women's 10,000 metres at the 1996 Summer Olympics.

References

1972 births
Living people
Athletes (track and field) at the 1996 Summer Olympics
Swiss female long-distance runners
Olympic athletes of Switzerland
Place of birth missing (living people)